Ravenna is a neighborhood in northeastern Seattle, Washington named after Ravenna, Italy.  Though Ravenna is considered a residential neighborhood, it also is home to several businesses, many of which are located in the University Village, a shopping mall.

Ravenna Park, located near University Village and the walking or biking route connecting Green Lake to Burke–Gilman Trail, is located within the neighborhood.

Ravenna and Ravenna-Bryant 
What is now Ravenna has been inhabited since the end of the last glacial period (c. 8000 BCE–10,000 years ago).  The Native American Duwamish (before contact, the Dkhw’Duw’Absh, "the People of the Inside") tribe of the Lushootseed (Skagit-Nisqually) Coast Salish nations had the prominent village of SWAH-tsoo-gweel ("portage") on then-adjacent Union Bay, and what is now Ravenna was their backyard before the arrival of White settlers. The Seattle, Lake Shore and Eastern Railway was built c. 1886 along what is now the Burke-Gilman Trail, following what was the shoreline past where the UW power plant and University Village are today. In 1890 mining and real estate magnate William Wirt Beck (1851-1944) filed the first plat on the 400 acres of land he owned covering most of the modern-day neighborhood, with the intention of creating an ideal community where his own home was one of the first to be built (and still stands several blocks East of the park). That same year he established the Seattle Female College, with classes held in Beck's home. Placement of churches and other civic structures would be modeled after the townsite's namesake, Ravenna, Italy. King County's first grist mill was also established at Ravenna in 1890 by the Ravenna Flouring Mill Company who built their mill along the railroad grade. 70 acres comprising old growth timber protected by a ravine were preserved by Beck for use as a park that would later become Ravenna Park. In 1891, a streetcar line followed 14th Avenue NE (what is now University Way NE, as illustrated in the Cowen's University Park Addition Seattle annex map below on this page), then followed near the southern boundary of what is now Ravenna Park, where the narrow right-of-way remains clearly visible beside the park.  Ravenna Boulevard was built in 1903 as a small part of the Olmsted Brothers' grand plan for Seattle streets and parks.
Ravenna incorporated as an independent town in 1906, which permitted Seattle to annex it in 1907. The original boundary of the Town of Ravenna when it was annexed extended from 15th Avenue NE eastward to 20th Avenue NE (above 65th Street NE) and eastward to 30th Ave NE (south of 65th Street NE), bounded on the south by 55th Street.  Ravenna south of the Burke-Gilman Trail is filled land from dump sites at 26th Avenue, filling the drained Union Bay Marsh and much of Union Bay. University Village (1956) was built on the southernmost reclaimed land in Ravenna.

Ravenna is bounded on the west by 15th and 20th Avenues NE, beyond which lies the Roosevelt neighborhood; on the north by NE 75th and 85th Streets, beyond which lie Maple Leaf and Wedgwood; on the east by 35th and 25th Avenues NE, beyond which lie View Ridge, Windermere and Laurelhurst; and on the south by NE Ravenna Boulevard, and NE Blakeley or NE 45th Streets, beyond which lie the University District and sometimes University Village (boundaries are informal).  University Village and Calvary Cemetery are in south Ravenna.

The adjacent Bryant neighborhood, or Ravenna-Bryant, extends the neighborhood east to 45th Avenue NE, south of NE 75th Street and north of Sand Point Way NE.

The principal arterial is 25th Avenue NE; minor arterials are 15th and 35th Avenues NE, and NE 65th Street; 40th Avenue NE and NE 55th Street are collector arterials. Besides the eponymous boulevard, arguably its most well-known street is Candy Cane Lane.  On the length of Park Road (one block and a little roundabout) residents have been creating an elaborate Christmas display since 1951, bringing bumper-to-bumper traffic to the boulevard on December nights. The 20th Avenue NE collector arterial has become increasingly bike- and pedestrian-friendly with the closure of the park bridge to motor vehicles (1975). NE Ravenna Boulevard is a local bikeway.

An eponymous grocery has been at the same location on the boulevard since the 1920s. Most emblematic of the neighborhood are Queen Mary, serving Victorian English Tea, and the Duchess Tavern (1934). The only Volvo dealership in town is family-owned and in Ravenna-Bryant.

The accompanying photograph shows an area around the railroad depot in the late 19th century. Between the depot and the mill could now be 25th Avenue NE at the Burke-Gilman Trail.  Left of the mill is the Ravenna Depot, center.  The straight road left continues past Roper's Grocery on 24th Street, just left of the tree, left of center, to what is now the SE corner of Ravenna Park, behind the house between the foreground trees.  Behind the hamlet of Ravenna, middle background, is the new Seattle Female College (c. 1890), "non-sectarian, distinctly Christian", and including the Seattle Conservatory of Music and Ravenna Seminary.  The stable for the college is beyond the depot.  Left of the college and above the small foreground snag, faintly, is a broad side of the Phillips house, still extant today.

Ravenna-Cowen Park

The conjoined Cowen Park and Ravenna Park is located at a southwest corner of Ravenna-Bryant, reaching from beyond the source of Ravenna Creek beside nearby Brooklyn Avenue and Ravenna Boulevard, under the 15th Avenue bridge to 25th Avenue NE. The parks comprise the centerpiece of the neighborhood.

For many decades of Seattle city history, the park ravine had been ignored by loggers and farmers and still possessed full old-growth timber rising nearly 400 feet. The trees remained through the Alaska–Yukon–Pacific Exposition of 1908, at which they were featured exhibitions. Public controversy about them declined after their gradual disappearance in suspicious circumstances by 1926. Today, none of that size remain anywhere in the world. The legacy helped save Seward and Carkeek parks, and helped galvanize conservation efforts ever since. Today, a single Sierra Redwood stands over the Medicinal Herb Garden at a south edge of the UW campus, at 106 feet somewhat over a quarter of the height of those of Cowen Park-Ravenna Park.

Ravenna Creek

Projects have included daylighting portions of the creek (partly with the goal of restoring native fish runs), building and maintaining trails, and restoring riparian habitat, sometimes in collaboration with the University of Washington's environmental science program. Completion of downstream daylighting to the mouth of the creek beside Union Bay Natural Area and restoration of migrating fish has come into conflict with property owners, specifically the owners of University Village, even though a revised daylighting project would not include their land.

See also 
 Burke–Gilman Trail
 Daylighting (streams)
 Ravenna Kibbutz
 Water resources

References

Bibliography 

 
   See heading, "Note about limitations of these data".
 
   Note caveat in footer.  Maps "NN-1030S", "NN-1040S".jpg dated June 17, 2002.
 
   The landscape carved by the Vashon Glacier some 14,000 years ago.
   Page links to Village Descriptions Duwamish-Seattle section.  Dailey referenced "Puget Sound Geography" by T. T. Waterman.  Washington DC:  National Anthropological Archives, mss. [n.d.] [ref. 2]; Duwamish et al. vs. United States of America, F-275.  Washington DC: US Court of Claims, 1927. [ref. 5]; "Indian Lake Washington" by David Buerge in the Seattle Weekly, August 1–7, 1984 [ref. 8]; "Seattle Before Seattle" by David Buerge in the Seattle Weekly, December 17–23, 1980. [ref. 9]; The Puyallup-Nisqually by Marian W. Smith.  New York: Columbia University Press, 1940. [ref. 10].  Recommended start is "Coast Salish Villages of Puget Sound"
 Dolan, Maria & True, Kathryn (2003). Nature in the city: Seattle. Seattle: Mountaineers Books, pp. 142–143.  (paperback).
 Engineering Department, Traffic and Transportation Division, Study : 20th Avenue N.E. bridge closure.  Seattle: The Dept. [sic], 1975.
 
   Dorpat referenced Seattle: Now and Then Vols. 1, 2, and 3. Seattle: Tartu Publications, 1984, 1988; Walt Crowley and Paul Dorpat, "The Ave: Streetcars to Street Fairs", typescript dated 1995 in possession of Walt Crowley and Paul Dorpat, Seattle, Washington; Walt Crowley,  Rites of Passage. Seattle: University of Washington Press, 1995; Cal McCune, From Romance to Riot: A Seattle Memoir. Seattle: Cal McCune, 1996; Roy Nielsen, UniverCity: The City Within City: The Story of the University District Seattle: University Lions Foundation, ca. 1986; Clark Humphrey, Loser: the Real Seattle Music Story. Portland, OR: Feral House, 1995.
 
 
   Updated at   "The Neighbors project was published weekly in the Seattle Post-Intelligencer from 1996 to 2000. This page remains available for archival purposes only and the information it contains may be outdated. For more updated information, please visit our Webtowns section."
 
 
 
 
 
  
 
 
 
   See also .
   High-Resolution Version, PDF format, 16.1 MB  Medium-Resolution Version, PDF format, 1.45 MB January 12, 2004.  Low-Resolution Version, PDF format, 825 KB January 12, 2004.  "Planned Arterials Map Legend Definitions", PDF format.  January 12, 2004. The high resolution version is good for printing, 11 x 17. The low and medium resolution versions are good for quicker online viewing. [Source: "Street Classification Maps, Note on Accessing These PDF Files"]
   Note caveat in footer.  Maps "NN-1030S", "NN-1040S".jpg dated June 17, 2002.

Further reading 
   Image of Ravenna Park and the greater University District to Union Bay-Portage Bay.
 
   / "with additions by Sunny Walter and local Audubon chapters." / Viewing locations only; the book has walks, hikes, wildlife, and natural wonders.

External links
Seattle.gov: Seattle Department of Neighborhoods – Ravenna

 
Former municipalities in Washington (state)
Streetcar suburbs